The Worplesdon Open Scratch Mixed Foursomes is an open mixed foursomes golf tournament contested annually at the Worplesdon Golf Club in Surrey since 1921. From its inception until the 1960s the event attracted many of the leading amateur golfers. The event was open to professionals and attracted some British women golfers who had lost their amateur status by taking up paid positions with golf equipment makers.

Joyce Wethered, a member at Worplesdon, won the event eight times with seven different partners. She also lost two finals, in 1921 when partnered by her brother Roger and in 1948 when partnered by her husband John Heathcoat-Amory.

The event is still played. It currently consists of a 36-hole stableford stage on a Saturday, after which the leading four pairs play semi-finals and a final on the following day.

Winners
The first final in 1921 was played over 18 holes but from 1922 to 1948 it was played over 36 holes, before reverting to 18 holes from 1949.

This list is incomplete

References

Amateur golf tournaments
Golf tournaments in England
Recurring sporting events established in 1921
1921 establishments in England